Santiago de la Rocha (born 19 April 1952) is a Spanish equestrian. He competed at the 1988 Summer Olympics and the 1992 Summer Olympics.

References

1952 births
Living people
Spanish male equestrians
Olympic equestrians of Spain
Equestrians at the 1988 Summer Olympics
Equestrians at the 1992 Summer Olympics
Sportspeople from Madrid